The 1980 Coupe de France Final was a football match held at Parc des Princes, Paris, on 7 June 1980 that saw AS Monaco FC defeat US Orléans of Division 2 3–1 thanks to goals by Albert Emon and Delio Onnis.

Match details

See also
1979–80 Coupe de France

External links
Coupe de France results at Rec.Sport.Soccer Statistics Foundation
Report on French federation site

Coupe
1980
Coupe De France Final 1980
Coupe De France Final
Coupe De France Final